Minucciano is a comune (municipality) in the Province of Lucca in the Italian region Tuscany, located about  northwest of Florence and about  northwest of Lucca.

Minucciano borders the following municipalities: Camporgiano, Casola in Lunigiana, Fivizzano, Massa, Piazza al Serchio, Sillano Giuncugnano,  Vagli Sotto.

References

External links

 Official website

Cities and towns in Tuscany